Allan Codling (24 February 1911 – q1 1991) was an English footballer who played in the Football League for Clapton Orient and Darlington. An outside left, he was on the books of Bolton Wanderers and Hartlepools United without playing for either in the league, and also played non-league football for Whitby United, Scarborough, Gresley Rovers and Folkestone.

Life and career
Codling was born in Guisborough, North Riding of Yorkshire. He began his football career with Whitby United as an amateur, before joining Bolton Wanderers. He played for Bolton's reserve team in the Central League, but not for the first team, and his contract was cancelled in January 1933. He immediately signed for Hartlepools United, and played for their reserves in the North-Eastern League, but again made no first-team appearances before leaving the club at the end of the season.

He began the 1933–34 season with Midland League club Scarborough, and spent the next with Gresley Rovers. While with Gresley he was chosen for the Central Combination select XI to play the champions, and had trials with Football League clubs Preston North End and Brighton & Hove Albion. Although a move to Brighton was reported to be well on the way to completion, Codling spent his next season with Southern League club Folkestone.

He finally played a Football League game at the start of the 1936–37 season, for Clapton Orient in the Third Division South. He set up the opening goal as Orient won 2–0 at Exeter City in September 1936, and scored three times himself from 32 league appearances over his two years with the club, against Gillingham both home and away in 1936–37, and at Torquay United in October 1937. His league career ended with seven matches for Darlington in the Third Division North. He played more frequently for their reserves, and was selected for the Rest of the North-Eastern League team for the match against the champions in March 1939.

Codling died in 1991.

Notes

References

1911 births
1991 deaths
People from Guisborough
English footballers
Association football wingers
Whitby Town F.C. players
Bolton Wanderers F.C. players
Hartlepool United F.C. players
Scarborough F.C. players
Gresley F.C. players
Folkestone F.C. players
Leyton Orient F.C. players
Darlington F.C. players
Midland Football League players
Southern Football League players
English Football League players
Sportspeople from Yorkshire